Lanierone is a pheromone emitted by the pine engraver and an odorous volatile component of saffron.

References

Enols
Pheromones
Saffron